D.A.V. Post-Graduate College is a co-educational institution for higher education in India. The Dayanand Anglo Vedic Postgraduate (popularly known as DAVPG) College, located at Siwan, Bihar, was established in 1941. The college is a Constituent College of Jai Prakash University, Chhapra, in Bihar. This institution was established by late Baidyanath Prasad alias Darhi Baba. The college, covering a total area of 16 acres, is situated in the urban area. It has been recognized by the University Grants Commission under section 2(f) and 12B of the UGC Act 1956.

Courses 
Courses are available at intermediate, undergraduate and post graduate level in the following subjects:

Arts 1. Hindi 2. Urdu 3.  English 4. Sanskrit 5. Philosophy 6. Economics 7. Political Science 8. History 9. Geography 10. Psychology

To be added: 13.Music 14. Home Science

Science 13. Mathematics 14. Physics 15. Chemistry 16. Zoology 17.  Botany Commerce 18. Commerce

Vocational courses are also available: B.C.A., B.B.A. and Mass Communication.

Ignou study centre 
Within the D.A.V. campus, there is an Ignou study centre.

References

External links 

Universities and colleges in Bihar
Constituent colleges of Jai Prakash University
Siwan, Bihar
Educational institutions established in 1941
1941 establishments in India